Dakota Avenue is the second album by Australian alternative country musician Sherry Rich.  It was released in 2012.

The album was released on Vitamin Records, Australia.

Track listing
 Good for You  
 41 Going On 17  
 Hopeful Heart  
 Saving It All  
 Pandora Mink  
 Mirror Ball  
 Puzzle Heart  
 Hotel Song  
 Bad Day  
 Same Old Paradise

References

Sherry Rich albums